Kala Airport  was an airstrip near Monganzu, a hamlet on the Ubangi River in Sud-Ubangi Province, Democratic Republic of the Congo.

Google Earth Historical Imagery (4/18/2017) shows brush and shrubbery have grown on the runway since the (5/24/2000) image.

See also

Transport in the Democratic Republic of the Congo
List of airports in the Democratic Republic of the Congo

References

External links
 OpenStreetMap - Kala

Airports in Sud-Ubangi